Tsang Hiu Yan (born 22 February 2002) is a Hong Kong badminton player.

Career 
In 2022, she participated in the Taipei Open and won the women's doubles title partnered with Ng Tsz Yau.

Achievements

BWF World Tour (1 title) 
The BWF World Tour, which was announced on 19 March 2017 and implemented in 2018, is a series of elite badminton tournaments sanctioned by the Badminton World Federation (BWF). The BWF World Tour is divided into levels of World Tour Finals, Super 1000, Super 750, Super 500, Super 300, and the BWF Tour Super 100.

Women's doubles

BWF International Challenge/Series (1 title, 2 runners-up) 
Women's doubles

  BWF International Challenge tournament
  BWF International Series

References

External links 
 

2002 births
Living people
Hong Kong female badminton players
21st-century Hong Kong women